An Arcanobacterium haemolyticum infection is any of several types of infection with the gram-positive bacillus Arcanobacterium haemolyticum. It can cause an acute pharyngitis, and it may cause an exanthem characterized by an erythematous, morbilliform or scarlatiniform eruption involving the trunk and extremities.

References

External links 

Bacterium-related cutaneous conditions